Michael David Carter  (born 13 November 1980) is an English former footballer who played in the Football League for Darlington, in the Icelandic 1.deild for Leiftur, and for numerous non-league clubs in the north-east of England. He played as a forward.

Carter was born in Darlington, and represented County Durham schools at under-15 level. He came through the youth system of his hometown club, Darlington F.C., and scored on his only appearance in the Football League, in a 3–0 win at home to Scarborough in November 1998. He played once more, as a substitute in the FA Cup defeat at Manchester City, before moving on to non-league football with Spennymoor United. He then spent the 2001 season in the Icelandic 1. deild with Leiftur before returning to non-league football in the north-east of England. His clubs included Whitby Town, West Auckland Town, Whitley Bay, Darlington Railway Athletic, and Darlington Cleveland Bridge.

References

1980 births
Living people
Footballers from Darlington
English footballers
Association football forwards
Darlington F.C. players
Spennymoor United F.C. players
Whitby Town F.C. players
West Auckland Town F.C. players
Whitley Bay F.C. players
Darlington Railway Athletic F.C. players
Darlington Cleveland Bridge F.C. players
English Football League players
Northern Premier League players
1. deild karla players
Northern Football League players